The Mutual Defense Assistance Act was a United States Act of Congress signed by President Harry S. Truman on 6 October 1949. For US Foreign policy, it was the first U.S. military foreign aid legislation of the Cold War era, and initially to Europe. The Act followed Truman's signing of the Economic Cooperation Act (the Marshall Plan), on April 3, 1948, which provided non-military, economic reconstruction and development aid to Europe.

The 1949 Act was amended and reauthorized on July 26, 1950. In 1951, the Economic Cooperation Act and Mutual Defense Assistance Act were succeeded by the Mutual Security Act, and its newly created independent agency, the Mutual Security Administration, to supervise all foreign aid programs, including both military assistance programs and non-military, economic assistance programs that bolstered the defense capability of U.S. allies.  

About the same time, the Mutual Defense Assistance Control Act of 1951, also known or referred to as the Battle Act, (65 Stat. 644; 22 U.S.C. 1611 et seq.) was also passed; it banned U.S. assistance to countries doing business with the Soviet Union and was so-named after its sponsor, Representative Laurie C. Battle of  Alabama.  Strong motivation for this 'control' act also came from export control concerns, following their tightening by the Export control Act of 1949 over Soviet advances; export controls were used for both domestic policy and later as an instrument of foreign policy.  This is exemplified by the restrictions on export of certain strategic or military items to the Soviet bloc or to other countries which it felt, if permitted, would be detrimental to the foreign policy program of the US.   This latter motive became so strong that it brought legislation directing the President to enlist the cooperation of other nations in enacting controls on trade with the Soviet block to parallel those of the United States.  The benefits of the various economic and military aid programs were to be withheld from non-cooperating nations.  The act covered a wide range of materials needed for the production of weapons, and was especially focused on anything that could aid atomic weapons research and construction.

As the Cold War developed, these acts were part of the American policy of containment of Communism.  They importantly provided defense assistance to any ally that might be attacked by the Soviet Union or one of its allies, while other programs provided non-military economic assistance.  In Asia the programs expanded with the newly established Maoist People's Republic of China, and other areas, with the development of specific country missions, including ones in Austria (1947–50), China (1946–48), Ireland (1948–51), and Trieste (1947–52).

Historical background : the World War II aftermath and the Cold War

In the euphoria of the end of World War II, western arsenals dropped down to a dangerous level of weakness and being worn-out. Public funds were, by priority, allocated to reconstruction. Even the US arsenal showed obvious signs of shortages and decay.

Military officials began calling for the introduction of a new defense legislation in 1947, arguing that depleted inventories of surplus World War II-vintage armaments, piecemeal planning of new armaments and restrictions on presidential authority threatened current and future efforts to arm allied nations. New legislation became a necessity by mid-1948 with the negotiation of the North Atlantic Treaty and the necessity to provide military aid to strengthen the connectional defenses, having in mind a global resistance to Communist expansion of the signatories.

Truman sent a first bill to Congress on 25 July 1949, the day he ratified the North Atlantic Treaty but congressional opposition forced submission of a new legislation, which specified the recipients and the amounts of assistance. Administration planners believed the MDAA's immediate effects would be to raise the morale of friendly nations and prove US reliability and resolve to meet Communist worldwide threats. The MDAA also institutionalized the concept of specific military aid programs, a result ensured by adoption of similar legislation in 1950 and an increase in annual spending on military aid to $5.222 billion after the outbreak of the Korean War - the very first large scale test of the validity and practicability of the concept, if excepting the logistical support allowed to France during the Indochina War.

Mutual Assistance Program

The Mutual Defense Assistance Act created the "Mutual Defense Assistance Program (MDAP)," which became an integral component in the federal government's policy of containment of Soviet expansion. This program differed from the World War II-era Lend-Lease program in that it never needed refunding from the country that benefits any military assistance. Between 1950 and 1967, $33.4 billion in arms and services and $3.3 billion worth of surplus weaponry were provided under the program.

Europe: NATO

On 4 April 1949, the foreign ministers from 12 countries signed the North Atlantic Treaty at the Departmental Auditorium in Washington D.C.: Belgium, Canada, Denmark, France, Iceland, Italy, Luxembourg, the Netherlands, Norway, Portugal, the United Kingdom and the United States. Provision for enlargement was however given by Article 10 of the North Atlantic Treaty, which states that membership is open to any "European State in a position to further the principles of this Treaty and to contribute to the security of the North Atlantic area".

Belgium and the Netherlands
Denmark and Norway
France :
Massive support was negotiated with France from 1950 to 1954 when the French Union fought the Chinese and Soviet-backed Viet Minh during the First Indochina War. Support included substantial financial aid, material supply from the US Army (uniforms, helmets, rifles, tanks), US Navy (aircraft carriers such as Belleau Wood/Bois Belleau), the U.S. Air Force (twelve Fairchild C-119, fighters, bombers and maintenance crews) and the Central Intelligence Agency (CIA) (twenty four pilots of the Civil Air Transport) from which two pilots were killed in action during the battle of Dien Bien Phu.
American military support to France's rearmament lasted well into the 1950s, the French receiving furthermore equipment including M46 Pattons, F-84 Thunderjet, etc. but the divergence between the United States and the Anglo-French alliance during the Suez crisis was to have decisive consequences on France-NATO relationships. Whereas the damage done to Anglo-American relations was quickly repaired, in the case of France, the situation remained more complex. France started to express reservations about the direction of Allied policy and US leadership and, following his election as President in 1958, General Charles de Gaulle, in particular, made clear his dissatisfaction with aspects of this US prominent  role, as well as, more specifically, with NATO's nuclear policy and NATO Military Command Structure. Although France was one of the very founding members of the Atlantic Alliance, President Charles de Gaulle withdrew France from NATO's military structure in 1966 in protest over American dominance of the Atlantic Alliance.

Germany
Greece

Italy
Portugal
On 4 April 1949, José Caeiro da Matta, Portuguese Minister for Foreign Affairs, signed the North Atlantic Treaty.
Spain
Turkey

Asia

 Indochinese Peninsula after independence : Vietnam, Laos, ..

Iran
Japan:
On 8 September 1951, the United States and Japan signed the Mutual Security Treaty, which stationed U.S. troops on Japanese soil for the defense of Japan following the eruption of the Korean War. On 8 March 1954, both countries signed the Mutual Defense Assistance Agreement (activated on 1 May 1954), focusing on defense assistance. It allowed for the presence of U.S. armed forces in Japan for the purpose of peace and security while encouraging Japan to take on more responsibility for its own defense, rearming in a manner suited for defensive purposes.

Pakistan:

During the Korean War, Pakistan sided with the West in their fight against communism. By joining the CENTO & SEATO alliances, Pakistan officially became a Major non-NATO ally of the US under which it received aid financially and militarily through the Mutual Defence Assistance program to defend herself from Afghanistan and India which were being supported by the Soviets.

Non aligned countries

The MDAA caused both a great deal of friction with the non-aligned countries and opportunities to tighten geopolitical relations with the western free world and especially the United States.

India:
India refused to accept any American-imposed limits on its trade and went ahead with shipments of Thorium nitrate to China. Realizing that cutting off all aid to India would do more harm than good, Secretary of State John Foster Dulles negotiated a solution.

Indonesia
Yugoslavia:
see references 
Up to the early 1960s, the Yugoslav People's Army (JNA) had a large arsenal of German equipment, planes and armor captured during the war,  western equipment that had been donated by the USA and Great Britain during the war, as well as Soviet equipment.
Despite Josip Broz Tito's firm adherence to communism, because of the ideological and personal conflict with Joseph Stalin, the Soviet Union - and thereafter all the Warsaw Pact's pro-Soviet governments - denounced his treaty of friendship with Yugoslavia on September 27, 1949. For some time it seemed to be a serious threat and a real danger of an intervention of the country by his former allies, so Yugoslavia accepted readily the American/British offer of assistance. There were even discussions at that time on its possible inclusion into North-Western Alliance. It can be said by now that Yugoslav armed forces received during this period standard NATO military equipment and arms - such as the F-86 and F-84 Thunderjet jet fighters or M36 Jackson and M18 Hellcat tank-destroyers. After Stalin's death and the political and ideological pacification with Soviet Union, the Yugoslav People's Army later exclusively imported their equipment from the USSR when not sourcing it internally.

Notes

References

Bibliography
Lawrence S. Kaplan: A Community of Interests: NATO and the Military Assistance Program, 1948–1951  (1980);
Chester J. Pach, Jr.: Arming the Free World: The Origins of the United States Military Assistance Program, 1945–1950  (1991);
Ronald E. Powaski: Toward an entangling alliance: American isolationism, internationalism, and Europe, 1901-1950 (1991);
Collective: Organizing the world: the United States and regional cooperation in Asia and Europe Galia Press-Barnathan (2003):
 further related bibliography ( incl. texts, digests, extracts ) on US international politic and diplomacy at : 0-313-27274-3&id=ZDAoVZqHwocC&hl=en&source=gbs_similarbooks_s&cad=1 Books.google.be Library
Vox the Belgian armed forces magazine
Carlos Caballero Jurado and Nigel Thomas : Central American Wars 1959-1980 (illustrated by Simon McCouaig) Osprey Publishing MEN-AT-ARM Serie n°221, 1990
Alejandro de Quesada : The Bay of Pigs - Cuba 1961 ( illustrated by Stephen Walsh ) - Osprey Publishing - Elite Serie n°166, 2009.

External links
 
 
 
 

Cold War history of the United States
1949 in law
1949 in the United States
1949 in international relations
1949 in military history
United States foreign relations legislation